Yuri Berchiche Izeta (born 10 February 1990) is a Spanish professional footballer who plays as a left-back for La Liga club Athletic Bilbao.

He began his senior career at Tottenham Hotspur without making a first-team appearance, being loaned to Cheltenham Town and Real Valladolid. In 2010 he joined Real Unión in the Segunda División, moving on to Real Sociedad who loaned him two years to Eibar, where he won two successive promotions, later spending three seasons in La Liga with Real, leading to him being signed by Paris Saint-Germain in 2017; he played a part in a treble-winning season in France, but transferred back to the Basque region with Athletic Bilbao in 2018.

Club career

Early years and Tottenham
Born in Zarautz, Gipuzkoa, Basque Country to an Algerian father and a Spanish mother, Berchiche started his career in the cantera of Real Sociedad, but left for rivals Athletic Bilbao at the age of 16. On 8 June 2007 Athletic and Tottenham Hotspur agreed on a transfer, and the player continued his footballing development in England at the club's academy; while playing for Tottenham's under-18 at the Eurofoot Tournament in Belgium, he was named "Player of the tournament", as Spurs won the competition after beating R.S.C. Anderlecht 4–0 in the final.

Berchiche joined League One team Cheltenham Town on a month's loan, on 26 March 2009. He made his league debut two days later, in a 1–1 away draw against Walsall.

In April 2009, Berchiche made a robust tackle on Scunthorpe United's Henri Lansbury (on loan from Arsenal), leaving his opponent with a suspected broken leg. Although he was not sent off for the challenge, Cheltenham manager Martin Allen ordered him to leave the field anyway; it was later revealed that Lansbury did not sustain any major damage to his leg.

In July 2009, Berchiche returned to Spain and joined Real Valladolid, still on loan. Benefitting from the absence of longtime incumbent Alberto Marcos due to injury, he started in the first league game, a 0–0 draw at UD Almería. It would be his only La Liga appearance of the season as he was mainly registered by the reserves, and the Castile and León side also suffered relegation.

Real Sociedad
In the summer of 2010, aged 20, Berchiche was released by Tottenham, signing a two-year contract with Real Unión in the Segunda División B. On 29 June 2012, after two full campaigns, he returned to Real Sociedad, who immediately loaned him to another team in the third tier, neighbouring SD Eibar.

In early 2014, Berchiche renewed his contract with the Txuriurdin until 2016. In June, after helping Eibar obtain promotion to the top flight for the first time in its history, he was selected by the Liga Nacional de Fútbol Profesional to its starting XI.

Berchiche returned to Real Sociedad in August 2014, being assigned to the main squad. He subsequently became the starter, replacing longtime incumbent Alberto de la Bella.

Paris Saint-Germain

On 7 July 2017, Berchiche signed a four-year contract with Paris Saint-Germain FC. He made his Ligue 1 debut on 8 September, playing the full 90 minutes in the 5–1 away win against FC Metz. His first goal in the competition arrived on 20 December, in a 3–1 home victory over Stade Malherbe Caen.

Berchiche played 32 competitive matches in his only season, winning three trophies including the national championship and the Coupe de France, defeating amateurs Les Herbiers VF 2–0 in the final of the latter tournament.

Athletic Bilbao
On 2 July 2018, PSG announced they had agreed a deal with Athletic Bilbao for the permanent transfer of Berchiche (an initial fee of €19 million, with a further €6 million in possible add-ons). The contract was announced as running through 2022, with a release clause of €100 million. He scored in only his second league appearance on 27 August, helping the hosts draw 2–2 against SD Huesca.

On 5 March 2020, late in the semi-final second leg of the Copa del Rey against Granada CF, Berchiche scored and enabled his team to progress on the away goals rule. In addition to the decisive game, which was delayed until April 2021 by the COVID-19 pandemic in Spain, they also qualified for the 2020–21 Supercopa de España which they won by beating FC Barcelona; however, he was unable to take part in those matches due to a thigh injury sustained against the same opposition a few weeks earlier. He recovered by the time the postponed 2020 final did take place, but his side lost to his previous employers Real Sociedad. Athletic also reached the 2021 Copa del Rey Final, played two weeks after the 2020 edition, only to be defeated again, 4–0 by Barcelona. That proved to be the player's last appearance of the campaign due to a persistent pubalgia issue which light treatment failed to cure, and an operation was carried out in July with an estimated recovery time of three months – manager Marcelino García Toral expressed his frustration at the delay in the injury being dealt with. Despite his physical problems, in October he agreed to an extension to his contract to run until 2024.

International career
Berchiche represented Spain at under-17 and under-18 levels. He also featured for the unofficial Basque Country regional team.

Berchiche declined approaches to play for Algeria on several occasions.

Career statistics

Club

Honours
Eibar
Segunda División: 2013–14

Paris Saint Germain
Ligue 1: 2017–18
Coupe de France: 2017–18
Coupe de la Ligue: 2017–18

Athletic Bilbao
Copa del Rey runner-up: 2019–20, 2020–21

References

External links

1990 births
Living people
People from Zarautz
Spanish people of Algerian descent
Spanish sportspeople of African descent
Spanish footballers
Footballers from the Basque Country (autonomous community)
Association football defenders
La Liga players
Segunda División players
Segunda División B players
Tercera División players
Antiguoko players
Athletic Bilbao footballers
Real Valladolid Promesas players
Real Valladolid players
Real Unión footballers
Real Sociedad footballers
SD Eibar footballers
English Football League players
Tottenham Hotspur F.C. players
Cheltenham Town F.C. players
Ligue 1 players
Paris Saint-Germain F.C. players
Spain youth international footballers
Basque Country international footballers
Spanish expatriate footballers
Expatriate footballers in England
Expatriate footballers in France
Spanish expatriate sportspeople in England
Spanish expatriate sportspeople in France